The 2019–20 Men's England Hockey League season was the 2019–20 season of England's field hockey league structure. The season started on 14 September 2019 and was due to end in March 2020, but finished on 12 September 2020 due to the COVID-19 pandemic in the United Kingdom. 

The defending champions were Hampstead and Westminster. Old Georgians, winners of the Hockey League Conference East replaced the relegated Sevenoaks. 

On 17 March 2020, the play-offs were suspended due to COVID. The play-offs were officially cancelled on 28 April 2020 and Surbiton were crowned champions.

Beeston Hockey Club won the delayed Championship Cup on 12 September 2020, defeating Bowdon and Fareham respectively.

Regular season

League table

Results

Top goalscorers

Play-offs
The semi-finals were scheduled to be played on 29 March at the home club venues and the final was scheduled to be played on 5 April at the Lee Valley Hockey and Tennis Centre in London. On 17 March 2020, the play-offs were suspended due to the COVID-19 pandemic in the United Kingdom. The play-offs were officially cancelled on 28 April 2020

Bracket

England Hockey Men's Championship Cup

Quarter-finals

Semi-finals

Final 

Beeston
Simon Hujwan (gk), Joshua Pavis, Ollie Willars, Kyle Marshall, Robbie Gleeson, Gareth Griffiths, Tom Crowson, Nick Park, Henry Croft, Alex Blumfield, Adam Dixon, Lucas Alcalde, Chris Proctor, Sam Apoola, Matthew Crookshanks, James Hunt.

Fareham
Rory Kemp (gk), Sam Ratcliffe, Tom Larcombe, Christian McKenna, Shane Vincent, Niall Stott, Danny Rawlings, Fergus Jackson, Josh Steel, Alex Boxall, Phillip Larcombe; subs-Jamie Young, Neil West, Dylan Coleman, Christopher Tagg, Alex Beckett.

See also
2019–20 Women's England Hockey League season

References

2019–20
England
2019 in English sport
2020 in English sport
Hockey League